Tony Donia is a Canadian former soccer player who played in the USL A-League, and the Canadian Professional Soccer League.

Playing career 
Donia played in the USL A-League in 1998 with the Toronto Lynx. The remaining halve of the season he signed with Glen Shields in the Canadian Professional Soccer League, and made his debut on June 3, 1998 against Toronto Croatia. In his debut season he assisted in clinching a postseason berth. He recorded his first goal for the club on June 6, 1999 against London City.

References 

Living people
Canadian soccer players
Toronto Lynx players
York Region Shooters players
A-League (1995–2004) players
Canadian Soccer League (1998–present) players
Association football defenders
Year of birth missing (living people)